Kamichetty Sri Parassourama Varaprassada Rao Naidu (2 October 1921 – 19 January 1989) was a member of the legislative assembly (MLA) of Puducherry, India from 1964 until his death in 1989. A government high school in Yanam was named with his name.

Birth and family
He was born in Yanam, the son of Former Maire de Yanaon, Kamichetty Venugopala Rao Naidou and Kamalamma. He married Kamichetty Savithri. He was an undisputed leader until his death in Yanam after his father.

Member of representative assembly
He was member of representative assembly between 1946 and 1964 by winning elections in 1946, 1955 and 1959. However, in 1951 elections he lost to Canacala Tataya.

Member of legislative assembly
He was never defeated throughout his political career. He held the constituency as his pocket borough without facing any challenge in winning the seat consecutively in 1964 (INC), 1969 (IND), 1974 (IND), 1977 (JP), 1980 (IND) and in 1985 (INC). As long as he was alive he contested without break from the first elections held in 1964 as per Representation of People Act for the territorial Assembly after de jure merger of Puducherry with India.

He contested most of the time as an Independent and was deputy speaker twice. Kamichetty became 10th Speaker of Puducherry Legislative Assembly after his elections in 1985. He died in office on 19 January 1989. He was the longest-serving Member of the Legislative Assembly (MLA) in the history of Puducherry Legislative Assembly until 1989.

Titles held

See also
Puducherry Legislative Assembly
Pondicherry Representative Assembly
1946 French India Representative Assembly election
1955 Pondicherry Representative Assembly election
1959 Pondicherry Representative Assembly election
1964 Pondicherry Legislative Assembly election
1969 Pondicherry Legislative Assembly election
List of speakers of the Puducherry Legislative Assembly
Bouloussou Soubramaniam Sastroulou
Samatam Krouschnaya

References

Notes

People from Yanam
Puducherry politicians
Telugu politicians
French India
French Hindus
French people of Telugu descent
1921 births
1989 deaths
Indian National Congress politicians from Puducherry
Janata Party politicians
Speakers of Puducherry Legislative Assembly
Deputy Speakers of Puducherry Legislative Assembly
Puducherry MLAs 1964–1969
Puducherry MLAs 1969–1974
Puducherry MLAs 1974–1977
Puducherry MLAs 1980–1985
Puducherry MLAs 1985–1990
Puducherry MLAs 1977–1980
Puducherry MLAs 1963–1964